The 1916–17 season saw Rochdale compete for their second season in the wartime football league, during World War I. Rochdale competed in the Lancashire section and finished 8th in the Principle Tournament and 1st in the Subsidiary Tournament.

Statistics
												

|}

Competitions

Football League - Lancashire Section

Friendlies

References

Rochdale A.F.C. seasons
Rochdale